Rupert Ryan (born 25 February 1974) is a football (soccer) player, who currently plays with Oxley United FC in Football Queensland Premier League 5.

International 
Ryan represented New Zealand at international level and scored two goals, in two games for the All Whites.

Ryan played two official A-international matches for the New Zealand in 1998, the first an 8–1 over Vanuatu,  on 28 September when he scored two goals, his second and final appearance a 1–0 win over Fiji on 2 October 1998.

References 

1975 births
Living people
Association football defenders
Wellington United players
Miramar Rangers AFC players
1998 OFC Nations Cup players
New Zealand association footballers
New Zealand international footballers